Svatava is a market town in Sokolov District in the Karlovy Vary Region of the Czech Republic. It has about 1,600 inhabitants.

Notable people
Ernst Mosch (1925–1999), musician

References

External links

Populated places in Sokolov District
Market towns in the Czech Republic